Újpest is the 4th District in Budapest, Hungary. It is located on the left bank of the Danube River. The name Újpest means "New Pest" because the city was formed on the border of the city of Pest, Hungary in 1838. Újpest was a village for 6 decades until 1907 when it became a town. In 1950, the town was unified with Budapest to form Greater Budapest. Since 1950, Újpest is the 4th District of Budapest.

The football club Újpest FC is named after the area, since they were formed in the district in 1885, and have played there ever since.

District 
The district is composed of six parts. Újpest is the largest, but the district also includes Megyer, Káposztásmegyer, Istvántelek, Székesdűlő and the northern tip of the island Népsziget.

History 

Isaac Lowy owned a shoe factory that he wanted to move to Pest but was unable to attain a settlement permit because he was Jewish. In 1835, he decided to create a new town where he would build the factory. North of Pest, there was an empty tract of land that was owned by the Károlyi nobles. Lowy bought the land; the deed included the right of religious freedom, the right to self-government, and the right to engage in business. By 1838, 13 Jewish families lived in Újpest; soon thereafter Christians began moving in.

Famous statues, like Wesselényi Monument, Matthias Corvinus Monument, were cast in bronze by the workshops of Alexander Matthias Beschorner from Újpest.

Sport
Újpest FC, football team
Újpesti Törekvés SE, football team
Újpesti MTE, football team
Újpesti TE (men's water polo)
Újpesti TE (ice hockey)

Politics 
The current mayor of IV. District of Budapest is Tibor Déri (DK).

The District Assembly, elected at the 2019 local government elections, is made up of 21 members (1 Mayor, 14 Individual constituencies MEPs and 6 Compensation List MEPs) divided into this political parties and alliances:

List of mayors

Famous residents 
 Julius Dessauer (b. 1832), rabbi and writer. 
 Lipa Goldman (b. 1905) chief rabbi of the Orthodox Jewish Community.
 Yosef Goldman scholar and bookdealer.
 Olivér Halassy (1909–1946), water polo player and freestyle swimmer.
 Isaac Lowy (1793–1847), Hungarian industrialist and founder of Újpest.
 Alexander Rado (1899–1981), Soviet spy.
 Ferenc Szusza
 Ludwig Venetianer (1867–1922), rabbi and writer.

Twin towns 
Újpest is twinned with:
  Marzahn-Hellersdorf of Berlin, Germany
  Tyresö, Sweden
  Chalcis, Greece
  Csíkszentgyörgy, Romania

Image gallery

See also 

 List of districts in Budapest
 Ujpest Synagogue

Notes

References

External links 
 Official Homepage of the district (Hungarian)
 Aerial photographs of Újpest

 
Populated places established in 1838
Urban planning in Hungary
1838 establishments in the Austrian Empire